Damian Jonak (born 24 April 1983, Włoszczowa, Poland) is a Polish professional boxer, fighting in the Light Middleweight division.

Amateur boxing 
After a year of judo, at age 10 he began training in boxing in Bytom under the supervision of Marian Łagocki and Mark Okroskowicza, who is now the first coach of the junior team and an assistant first team coach seniors. The seniors coached in the BCS Imex Hawks led by Zbigniew kick and Fyodor Lapin and rollers Zabrze under the wings of Christopher snuff.

He fought 168 amateur fights, of which 153 won twice won the Polish championship cadets and juniors. Then twice was a youth champion Polish super welterweight. His biggest success in the ring is an amateur winning the bronze medal in the Junior European Championships in the 67 kg category. Most wins fighting ended ahead of time.

Professional record

|-
|align="center" colspan=8|40 fights, 39 wins (21 knockouts), ,0 losses (0 knockouts), 1 draw
|-
|align=center style="border-style: none none solid solid; background: #e3e3e3"|Result
|align=center style="border-style: none none solid solid; background: #e3e3e3"|Record
|align=center style="border-style: none none solid solid; background: #e3e3e3"|Opponent
|align=center style="border-style: none none solid solid; background: #e3e3e3"|Type
|align=center style="border-style: none none solid solid; background: #e3e3e3"|Round, time
|align=center style="border-style: none none solid solid; background: #e3e3e3"|Date
|align=center style="border-style: none none solid solid; background: #e3e3e3"|Location
|align=center style="border-style: none none solid solid; background: #e3e3e3"|Notes
|- align=center
|Win
|39-0-1
|align=left| Ayoub Nefzi
|
|
|
|align=left|
|align=left|
|- align=center
|Win
|38-0-1
|align=left| Bradley Pryce
|
|
|
|align=left|
|align=left|
|- align=center
|Win
|37-0-1
|align=left| Kris Carslaw
|
|
|
|align=left|
|align=left|
|- align=center
|Win
|36-0-1
|align=left| Max Maxwell
|
|
|
|align=left|
|align=left|
|- align=center
|Win
|35-0-1
|align=left| Jackson Osei Bonsu
|
|
|
|align=left|
|align=left|
|- align=center
|Win
|34-0-1
|align=left| Laszlo Fazekas
|
|
|
|align=left|
|align=left|
|- align=center
|Win
|33-0-1
|align=left| Anderson Clayton
|
|
|
|align=left|
|align=left|
|- align=center
|Win
|32-0-1
|align=left| Sebastian Skrzypczynski
|
|
|
|align=left|
|align=left|
|- align=center
|Win
|31-0-1
|align=left| Alex Bunema
|
|
|
|align=left|
|align=left|
|- align=center
|Win
|30-0-1
|align=left| Mamadou Thiam
|
|
|
|align=left|
|align=left|
|- align=center
|Win
|29-0-1
|align=left| Albert Starikov
|
|
|
|align=left|
|align=left|
|- align=center
|Win
|28-0-1
|align=left| Jose Luis Cruz
|
|
|
|align=left|
|align=left|
|- align=center
|Win
|27-0-1
|align=left| Turgay Uzun
|
|
|
|align=left|
|align=left|
|- align=center
|Win
|26-0-1
|align=left| Ionut Trandafir Ilie
|
|
|
|align=left|
|align=left|
|- align=center
|Win
|25-0-1
|align=left| Mazen Girke
|
|
|
|align=left|
|align=left|
|- align=center
|Win
|24-0-1
|align=left| Nicolas Guisset
|
|
|
|align=left|
|align=left|
|- align=center
|style="background:#abcdef;"|Draw
|24-0-1
|align=left| Mariusz Cendrowski
|
|
|
|align=left|
|align=left|
|- align=center
|Win
|24-0
|align=left| Sylvestre Marianini
|
|
|
|align=left|
|align=left|
|- align=center
|Win
|23-0
|align=left| Tarik Sahibeddine
|
|
|
|align=left|
|align=left|
|- align=center
|Win
|22-0
|align=left| Domingos Monteiro
|
|
|
|align=left|
|align=left|
|- align=center
|Win
|21-0
|align=left| Janos Petrovics
|
|
|
|align=left|
|align=left|
|- align=center
|Win
|20-0
|align=left| Mika Joensuu
|
|
|
|align=left|
|align=left|
|- align=center
|Win
|19-0
|align=left| Louis Mimoune
|
|
|
|align=left|
|align=left|
|- align=center
|Win
|18-0
|align=left| Sebastien Spengler
|
|
|
|align=left|
|align=left|
|- align=center
|Win
|17-0
|align=left| Alexander Benidze
|
|
|
|align=left|
|align=left|
|- align=center
|Win
|16-0
|align=left| Rafael Chiruta
|
|
|
|align=left|
|align=left|
|- align=center
|Win
|15-0
|align=left| Koba Karkashadze
|
|
|
|align=left|
|align=left|
|- align=center
|Win
|14-0
|align=left| Michael Schubov
|
|
|
|align=left|
|align=left|
|- align=center
|Win
|13-0
|align=left| Janis Cernauskis
|
|
|
|align=left|
|align=left|
|- align=center
|Win
|12-0
|align=left| Samson Oludayo
|
|
|
|align=left|
|align=left|
|- align=center
|Win
|11-0
|align=left| Vladimir Fecko
|
|
|
|align=left|
|align=left|
|- align=center
|Win
|10-0
|align=left| Patrik Prokopecz
|
|
|
|align=left|
|align=left|
|- align=center

References

1983 births
Living people
People from Włoszczowa County
Polish male boxers
Light-middleweight boxers